William Kirby may refer to:

 William Kirby (entomologist) (1759–1850), English entomologist
 William Kirby (author) (1817–1906), Canadian author
 William C. Kirby (born 1950), professor at Harvard University
 William F. Kirby (1867–1934), American politician
 William Forsell Kirby (1844–1912), English entomologist & folklorist
 William T. Kirby (1911–1990), businessman
 William Kirby (Gaelic footballer) (fl. 1990s–2010s), Gaelic footballer
 William Kirby (footballer, born 1883) (1883–1917), English footballer
 William Kirby (cricketer) (born 1981), English cricketer
 Bill Kirby (born 1975), Australian swimmer
 Cam Kirby or William J. Cameron Kirby (1909–2003), Canadian politician